Aitor Aldalur Agirrezabala (born 26 December 1991) is a Spanish footballer who plays for SD Amorebieta as a right back.

Club career
Born in Tolosa, Gipuzkoa, Basque Country, Aldalur was a Real Sociedad youth graduate. He made his senior debut with the reserves in the 2009–10 campaign, achieving promotion from Tercera División.

In 2011, after featuring sparingly for Sanse, Aldalur moved to Segunda División B side SD Amorebieta. He left the club in 2013, and subsequently represented fellow league teams Lleida Esportiu, Barakaldo CF, SD Leioa, Racing de Ferrol, CD Toledo and Burgos CF before returning to the Azules in August 2019.

Aldalur was a regular starter for Amorebieta during the 2020–21 season, as his side achieved a first-ever promotion to Segunda División. He made his professional debut at the age of 29 on 16 October 2021, coming on as a late substitute for Gaizka Larrazabal in a 2–3 home loss against FC Cartagena.

References

External links

1991 births
Living people
People from Tolosa, Spain
Spanish footballers
Footballers from the Basque Country (autonomous community)
Association football defenders
Segunda División players
Segunda División B players
Tercera División players
Real Sociedad B footballers
SD Amorebieta footballers
Lleida Esportiu footballers
Barakaldo CF footballers
SD Leioa players
Racing de Ferrol footballers
Burgos CF footballers
Sportspeople from Gipuzkoa